Never Again is the fifth EP by English hardcore punk band Discharge. It was released in 1981.

The cover features an infamous photograph of a dove impaled on a dagger. It is a 1932 work by John Heartfield titled "The Meaning of Geneva, Where Capital Lives, There Can Be No Peace".

Track listing
All tracks written by Discharge
"Never Again" - 2:23
"Death Dealers" - 1:44
"Two Monstrous Nuclear Stockpiles" - 1:09

Personnel
Discharge
Kelvin "Cal" Morris - vocals, sleeve design
Anthoney "Bones" Roberts - guitar
Roy "Rainy" Wainright - bass
Garry "Gary" Maloney - drums

References

Discharge (band) EPs
1981 EPs
Albums produced by Mike "Clay" Stone